The 42nd G7 summit was held on 26–27 May 2016 at the Shima Kanko Hotel in Kashiko Island, Shima, Mie Prefecture, Japan. In March 2014, the G7 declared that a meaningful discussion was currently not possible with Russia in the context of the G8. Since then, meetings have continued within the G7 process.

Host selection 
Eight Japanese cities bid to host the 42nd G7 summit in 2016. Prime Minister Shinzō Abe announced on 5 June 2015 that Shima in Mie Prefecture was selected against other bids from Hiroshima, Kobe, Nagoya, Sendai, Niigata, Karuizawa and Hamamatsu. 

When the central government's deadline closed in August 2014 for prefectural governors to apply to host the summit, Mie Prefecture was not in the running. A member of the Prime Minister's Office actually contacted the governor of Mie Prefecture in December 2014, encouraging him to submit a bid. Mie Prefecture was subsequently declared a candidate on 21 January 2015. 

Ise Grand Shrine had an advantage in terms of security, as it has regularly hosted visits by both the Imperial family and Japanese political leaders. Another plus was its location in close proximity to Chūbu Centrair International Airport in the Aichi Prefecture, offering easy access to visitors. However, Prime Minister Abe had long had a fascination with Ise Shrine. Abe visits the shrine every year after New Year's holiday, and has even been known to postpone meetings so that he could attend a ceremony held at the shrine.

Leaders at the summit 
The attendees will include the leaders of the seven G7 member states as well as representatives of the European Union. The President of the European Commission is a permanently welcome participant in all meetings and decision-making since 1981.

The 42nd G7 summit was the first summit for Canadian Prime Minister Justin Trudeau. It was also the final summit for British Prime Minister David Cameron, French President François Hollande, Italian Prime Minister Matteo Renzi, and U.S. President Barack Obama.

Participants

Agenda 
The Japanese G7 presidency announced the following agenda:

Global economy and trade 
The G7 leaders aim to address challenges affecting the growth of the world economy, like slowdowns in emerging markets and drops in price of oil.

The G7 also issued a warning in the wake of the upcoming referendum on the United Kingdom's membership of the European Union that "a UK exit from the EU would reverse the trend towards greater global trade and investment, and the jobs they create and is a further serious risk to growth". Commitment to an EU–Japan Free Trade Agreement – which would mean the elimination of the vast majority of trade tariffs, and boost imports and exports in key areas such as agriculture, car manufacturing and clothing, and which the British government alleges "will be worth the equivalent of £200 for every household" – was solidified, with a possible signing in autumn. David Cameron also claimed that the deal, alongside the highly unpopular Transatlantic Trade and Investment Partnership (TTIP) and the Trans Pacific Partnership (TPP), would boost the world economy by £340bn.

Despite this, in the wake of the Panama Papers, an editorial by Oxfam Canada titled "G7 sides with tax dodgers" criticised the G7's commitment to free trade; the editorial said: G7 leaders have sided with the tax dodgers and not the public. Despite all the talk of action, the G7 have missed this opportunity to end the destructive era of tax havens, and the world's poorest people – especially women and girls, will pay the price."

Foreign policy 
The G7 leaders aim to discuss current foreign policy issues like counter-terrorism, conflicts in the Middle East, the Ukrainian crisis, North Korea's nuclear program and the territorial disputes in the South China Sea.

Climate change and energy 
The G7 leaders will discuss "how to lead the overall efforts of the international community in addressing climate change" following the signing of the Paris Agreement in April. The leaders will also discuss their leading role in energy policy and ensuring energy security.

Development 
As the first G7 summit following the adoption of the Sustainable Development Goals in September 2015, the G7 leaders will discuss advancing and promoting the Goals.

Quality infrastructure investment 
The G7 leaders will discuss the importance of quality infrastructure investment contributing to sustainable development.

Health 
The G7 leaders will discuss strengthening the response to widespread epidemics "by taking into account the lessons learned from previous outbreaks" like the Ebola virus epidemic in West Africa. They will also discuss the promotion of universal health care.

Women 
The G7 leaders will discuss the promotion of women's empowerment in education, science and technology and in a wider range of areas.

Gallery of participating leaders

Invited guests

See also 
G8
Ise-Shima
Ise-Shima National Park
G7 Kitakyushu Energy Ministerial Meeting

References

External links 

 Official site

21st-century diplomatic conferences (Global)
2016 conferences
2016 in international relations
Diplomatic conferences in Japan
2016
May 2016 events in Japan
Shima, Mie